The 2009–10 Greek Basket League season was the 70th season of the Greek Basket League, the highest tier professional basketball league in Greece. The winner was Panathinaikos that won Olympiacos in the finals of the championship.

Teams

Regular season

Standings

Pts=Points, Pld=Matches played, W=Matches won, L=Matches lost, F=Points for, A=Points against, D=Points difference

Playoffs
Teams in italics had home advantage. Teams in bold won the playoff series. Numbers to the left of each team indicate the team's original playoff seeding. Numbers to the right indicate the score of each playoff game.

Final league standings

Maroussi forfeited their place in the 2010–11 Euroleague Qualification Round.
Aris took the place of Kolossos in the Eurocup 2010–11 Qualification Round.

Awards

MVP
 Mike Batiste – Panathinaikos

Finals MVP
 Mike Batiste – Panathinaikos

Best Young Player
 Nikos Pappas – Kolossos

Coach of the Year
 Georgios Bartzokas – Maroussi

Greek League Best Five

References

External links
Official HEBA Site
Official Hellenic Basketball Federation Site
2009-10 A1 Standings And Stats

Greek Basket League seasons
1
Greek